Promechus is a genus of beetles belonging to the Chrysomelidae family.

List of species
The genus includes the following species:

 Promechus abidi Gressitt & Hart, 1974
 Promechus arcuatus (Clavareau, 1912)
 Promechus australicus (Jacoby, 1887)
 Promechus bimaculatus (Weise, 1918)
 Promechus buprestoides Gressitt & Hart, 1974
 Promechus corallipes (Gestro, 1875)
 Promechus costatus (Jacoby, 1906)
 Promechus eburneocinctus Gressitt & Hart, 1974
 Promechus formosus (Gestro, 1876)
 Promechus gestroi (Jacoby, 1906)
 Promechus giganteus Gressitt & Hart, 1974
 Promechus helleri (Clavareau, 1906)
 Promechus inflatus Gressitt & Hart, 1974
 Promechus lacustris Gressitt & Hart, 1974
 Promechus latefasciatus (Jacoby, 1887)
 Promechus magnificus (Baly, 1863)
 Promechus meeki (Jacoby, 1906)
 Promechus metallicus Gressitt & Hart, 1974
 Promechus montanus (Heller, 1910)
 Promechus moszkowskii (Kuntzen, 1913)
 Promechus orientalis Gressitt & Hart, 1974
 Promechus paniae Gressitt & Hart, 1974
 Promechus parentheticus Gressitt & Hart, 1974
 Promechus parvus Gressitt & Hart, 1974
 Promechus pittospori Gressitt & Hart, 1974
 Promechus prosopon Gressitt & Hart, 1974
 Promechus pulchellus (Gestro, 1876)
 Promechus pulcher Gressitt & Hart, 1974
 Promechus regalis (Baly, 1863)
 Promechus schefflerae Gressitt & Hart, 1974
 Promechus sculpturatus (Heller, 1910)
 Promechus sedlacekorum Gressitt & Hart, 1974
 Promechus shanahani Gressitt & Hart, 1974
 Promechus splendens (Guérin-Méneville, 1833)
 Promechus straatmani Gressitt & Hart, 1974
 Promechus stygicus Gressitt & Hart, 1974
 Promechus subapicalis Gressitt & Hart, 1974
 Promechus sulcatus Gressitt & Hart, 1974
 Promechus sumptuosus (Gestro, 1876)
 Promechus telefominus Gressitt & Hart, 1974
 Promechus toxopei Gressitt & Hart, 1974
 Promechus tripartitus (Lea, 1915)
 Promechus variicollis Gressitt & Hart, 1974
 Promechus whitei (Baly, 1861)

References

 Universal Biological Indexer

Chrysomelinae
Chrysomelidae genera
Taxa named by Jean Baptiste Boisduval